The following are international rankings of Australia.

References

Australia